Nothing to You (re-mix) + 3 is an EP released by the San Francisco Indie rock duo Two Gallants in 2006 by Alive Records.

The EP features two songs from the band's debut album The Throes, newly re-mixed and the songs "Sweet Baby Jesus" and "Fail Hard to Regain (live)" from the band's first 7" release. These two are released on CD on this EP for the first time. The 4 tracks have been entirely remastered.

Track listing
"Nothing to You (Remix)"
"Crow Jane (Remix)"
"I'm Her Man (Sweet Baby Jesus)"
"Fail Hard to Regain (Live)"

Credits
John Greenham - Mastering
John Karr - Engineer
Alex Newport - Mixing

References

2006 debut EPs
2006 remix albums
Two Gallants (band) albums
Remix EPs
Alive Naturalsound Records albums